The Municipal Corporation (Elections) Act 1869 (32 & 33 Vict c 55), sometimes called the Municipal Franchise Act 1869 or the Municipal Corporation (Election) Act 1869, was an Act of the Parliament of the United Kingdom.

The Bill for this Act was the Municipal Franchise Bill. Bill 85 was introduced by John Tomlinson Hibbert.

Unmarried women ratepayers received the right to vote in local government elections in the Municipal Franchise Act 1869. This right was confirmed in the Local Government Act 1894 and extended to include some married women. By 1900, more than 1 million women were registered to vote in local government elections in England.

Sections 6 and 7 were repealed by section 12 of, and the Second Schedule to, the Municipal Elections Act 1875.

See also 

 Women's suffrage in the United Kingdom

References
Lely, John Mounteney. "Municipal Corporations (Elections) Act 1869". Chitty's Collection of Statutes of Practical Utility. Fourth Edition. Henry Sweet. Stevens and Sons. Chancery Lane, London. 1880. Volume 1. Title "Corporations". Pages 1405 to 1408.
Paterson, William. "Municipal Franchise Act". The Practical Statutes of the Session 1869. Horace Cox. Wellington Street, Strand, London. 1869. Pages 126 to 131.

Suffrage
Women in the United Kingdom
Election law in the United Kingdom